Cody Chetty (born 28 June 1991) is a South African former first-class cricketer who played for the Dolphins cricket team. He played primarily as a middle-order batsman. In August 2017, he was named in Durban Qalandars' squad for the first season of the T20 Global League. However, in October 2017, Cricket South Africa initially postponed the tournament until November 2018, with it being cancelled soon after. In September 2018, he was named in KwaZulu-Natal Inland's squad for the 2018 Africa T20 Cup.

In October 2020, Chetty announced his retirement from cricket. However, in June 2021, Chetty was selected in the players' draft ahead of the Minor League Cricket tournament in the United States.

References

External links
 

1991 births
Living people
South African cricketers
Dolphins cricketers
KwaZulu-Natal Inland cricketers
Cricketers from Durban